William Ronald Forrester Jr. (born December 18, 1957) is an American former competition swimmer, Olympic medalist, and former world record-holder.  He represented the United States as an 18-year-old at the 1976 Summer Olympics in Montreal, Quebec, where he won a bronze medal in the 200-meter butterfly, finishing behind U.S. teammates Mike Bruner and Steve Gregg. Forrester won three gold and two bronze medals at the world championships in 1975 and 1978. Forrester graduated from Auburn University in 1980 and later worked as a swim coach, founding the Georgia Coastal Aquatic Team in 1994.

See also
 List of Auburn University people
 List of Olympic medalists in swimming (men)
 List of World Aquatics Championships medalists in swimming (men)
 World record progression 4 × 200 metres freestyle relay

References

1957 births
Living people
American male butterfly swimmers
American male freestyle swimmers
Auburn Tigers men's swimmers
World record setters in swimming
Olympic bronze medalists for the United States in swimming
Swimmers at the 1976 Summer Olympics
People from Darby, Pennsylvania
World Aquatics Championships medalists in swimming
Medalists at the 1976 Summer Olympics
Swimmers from Pennsylvania